Sokal (romanized: Sokal) is a city located on the Bug River in Chervonohrad Raion, Lviv Oblast of western Ukraine. It hosts the administration of Sokal urban hromada, one of the hromadas of Ukraine. The population is approximately

History 

The first written mention of Sokal dates from 1377. In 1424, it received Magdeburg rights from Siemowit IV, Duke of Masovia, and in 1462, the town became part of Belz Voivodeship, Lesser Poland Province of the Polish Crown. On August 2, 1519, following the defeat of a Polish-Lithuanian army under Hetman Konstanty Ostrogski by Crimean Tatars, the town was razed by the invaders. Mikolaj Sep-Szarzynski later dedicated one of his poems to this battle.

The town remained part of Poland until the first partition of Poland, when it was annexed by the Habsburg Empire, as part of Galicia. It was the capital of the Sokal district, one of the 78 Bezirkshauptmannschaften in the Austrian Galicia province (Crown land) in 1900. After World War I, possession of this province was disputed between Poland and Soviet Russia, until the 1921 Peace of Riga, which attributed Eastern Galicia to Poland. In the Second Polish Republic, Sokal was the seat of a county in Lwow Voivodeship.

Sokal was in Polish territory until the German invasion of Poland in September 1939. From September 1939 until June 1941 (see Operation Barbarossa), it was part of Soviet-held territory. Before the Holocaust, Sokal had a Jewish population of 5,200; in addition, thousands of refugees from other parts of Poland arrived in Sokal. On September 17, 1942, 2,000 Jews from Sokal were deported to Bełżec extermination camp. There was a severe water shortage in the Sokal ghetto. On October 24, 1942, a further 2,500 Jews from the town were deported to the Bełżec gas chambers. On May 27, 1943, the ghetto was liquidated and the town declared 'judenrein'. Only 30 Jews from the town survived the war, including 15 members of 3 families rescued by the Halamajowa family, consisting of the Polish Catholic grandmother Franciszka, her daughter and son (see No.4 Street of Our Lady). The Soviet army recaptured the town in July 1944, though the western part of the town (the former village of Zhvirka) remained part of Poland between 1944 and 1951 (see 1951 Polish–Soviet territorial exchange).

In the early 17th century, a large Baroque monastery of the Bernardine monks, together with the Roman Catholic church of the Virgin Mary was built in Sokal. The complex is located in the district of Zhvirka, and until World War II, it housed a painting of Our Lady of Sokal, which attracted Catholic pilgrims. Jan Ostrorog, one of the first Polish humanists was buried in the town. After World War II, the painting was moved to a church in Hrubieszow, while the monastery was turned into a prison. On March 27, 2012, the historic complex was almost completely destroyed by fire.

Until 18 July 2020, Sokal was the administrative center of Sokal Raion. The raion was abolished in July 2020 as part of the administrative reform of Ukraine, which reduced the number of raions of Lviv Oblast to seven. The area of Sokal Raion was merged into Chervonohrad Raion.

Notable people 

 Mieczyslaw Klimowicz, World War II historian
 Franciszka Halamajowa, subject of No. 4 Street of Our Lady
 Czesław Hernas, philologist and folklorist
 Omelan Pleszkewycz, co-founder of the Selfreliance Ukrainian American Credit Union in Chicago and president of the World Council of Ukrainian Credit Unions
 Walter Smishek, politician and labour leader in Saskatchewan

In fiction 
Sokal is the location of the opening of the 2009 novel The Kindly Ones by Jonathan Littell, which takes place immediately following the German invasion of Soviet-occupied Poland in June 1941.
Sokal is mentioned in The Good Soldier Švejk by Jaroslav Hašek as the town passed by Austro-Hungarian soldiers on the way to the battlefields of World War I.
The short story Squadron Commander Trunov by Isaac Babel centres around the burial of the title character in the public gardens next to Sokal's cathedral.

In film
Sokal was the setting for two documentary films: One was the No.4 Street of Our Lady (2009) about the rescue of three Jewish families in Sokal by Franciczka Halamajowa family, and the other was The Same Snowy Ground (2020), that featured the ruined synagogue and the new park and told the tale of the town's Jewish community.

Gallery

References

External links 
  Sokal in the Geographical Dictionary of the Kingdom of Poland (1890)
 Golos z-nad Bugu
 

Cities in Lviv Oblast
Lwów Voivodeship
Cities of district significance in Ukraine
Holocaust locations in Ukraine